Locomotive engineer may refer to:
 Locomotive builder, a person who designs and builds locomotives
 Train driver, a person who operates a locomotive
 Locomotive Engineer, an American periodical begun in 1888 and edited by John A. Hill